The 1993 FIA 2-Litre World Rally Cup was the first season of the FIA 2-Litre World Rally Cup, an auto racing championship recognized by the Fédération Internationale de l'Automobile, running in support of the World Rally Championship. It was created for cars with engine size below 2 Litres.

Season summary

FIA 2-Litre World Rally Cup

See also 

World Rally Championship
FIA 2-Litre World Rally Cup